Family Tree is a 1999 American family drama film directed by Duane Clark and starring Robert Forster, Naomi Judd, Andrew Lawrence, Matthew Lawrence and Cliff Robertson.

Cast
Robert Forster as Henry Musser
Naomi Judd as Sarah Musser
Cliff Robertson as Larry
Andrew Lawrence as Mitch Musser
Matthew Lawrence as Mark Musser
Tyler Hoechlin as Jeff Jo
Corbin Bleu as Ricky

References

External links
 
 

American drama films
1990s English-language films
Films directed by Duane Clark
1990s American films